The 1959 Pro Bowl was the NFL's ninth annual all-star game which featured the outstanding performers from the 1958 season. The game was played on January 11, 1959, at the Los Angeles Memorial Coliseum in Los Angeles, California in front of 72,250 fans. The final score was East 28, West 21.

The West team was led by the Baltimore Colts' Weeb Ewbank while Jim Lee Howell of the New York Giants coached the East squad. New York Giants quarterback Frank Gifford was selected as the outstanding back of the game and defensive lineman Doug Atkins of the Chicago Bears was named the outstanding lineman.

References

External links

Pro Bowl
Pro Bowl
Pro Bowl
Pro Bowl
1959 in Los Angeles
National Football League in Los Angeles
January 1959 sports events in the United States